Mallur, Haveri is a village in Haveri district Byadagi Taluka of Karnataka, India.

References

Villages in Dharwad district